The Anieș is a right tributary of the river Someșul Mare in Romania. Upstream from its confluence with the Anieșul Mic, it is also referred to as Anieșul Mare. It discharges into the Someșul Mare in the village Anieș.

References

Rivers of Romania
Rivers of Bistrița-Năsăud County